Chrysodeixis diehli is a moth of the family Noctuidae. It is found throughout Sundaland.

External links
Chrysodeixis at funet
Species info at Moths of Borneo

Plusiinae
Moths described in 1982